The English National League was an early ice hockey league in England.  It was founded in 1935 by most of the teams who had previously competed in the English League.  It was suspended during the Second World War, but returned in 1946.  In 1954 the league merged with the Scottish National League to form the British National League.

Champions
1936: Wembley Lions
1937: Wembley Lions
1938: Harringay Racers
1939: Harringay Greyhounds
1940: Harringay Greyhounds
1947: Brighton Tigers
1948: Brighton Tigers
1949: Harringay Racers
1950: Streatham
1951: Nottingham Panthers
1952: Wembley Lions
1953: Streatham
1954: Nottingham Panthers

References
A to Z encyclopaedia of ice hockey

See also

British ice hockey league champions

 
Defunct ice hockey leagues in the United Kingdom
Defunct sports leagues in England
Sports leagues established in 1935
1935 establishments in England
1954 disestablishments in England
Ice hockey leagues in England